PFC CSKA Moscow is an association football club based in Moscow, that competes in the Russian Premier League, the top football league in Russia. Established in 1911, the club is one of the oldest teams in Russia.

Key 

 P = Played
 W = Games won
 D = Games drawn
 L = Games lost
 F = Goals for
 A = Goals against
 Pts = Points
 Pos = Final position

 Top League = 1992-1997
 Top Division = 1998-2001
 Premier League = 2002-Present
 LC = League Cup
 RSC  = Russian Super Cup
 CWC = European/UEFA Cup Winners' Cup
 UC = UEFA Cup
 EL = UEFA Europa League
 CL = UEFA Champions League
 USC = UEFA Super Cup

 QR1/2/3 = First/Second/Third Qualifying Round etc.
 PO = Playoff Round
 GS = Group stage
 R32 = Round of 32
 R16 = Round of 16
 QF = Quarter-finals
 SF = Semi-finals
 F = Final
 W = Winners

League and Cup history

Soviet Union

Russia

Notes

References